Social Justice is a quarterly peer-reviewed academic journal that was established in 1974 as Crime and Social Justice. It absorbed Contemporary Marxism (1980–1986) in 1987 and adopted its current name in 1988. The journal covers research on all aspects of social justice, including issues of crime, police repression, and the penal system; globalization; human and civil rights; immigration issues; welfare and education, ethnic and gender relations, and persistent global inequalities. The editors-in-chief are Stefania De Petris and Gregory Shank.

External links 
 

English-language journals
Quarterly journals
Political science journals
Publications established in 1974
Social justice